Father Joseph Curr (1793 – 29 June 1847) was a Roman Catholic priest and author who was called a "martyr of charity" for his work in Leeds in the typhus epidemic of 1847.

He was born in Sheffield on 14 April 1793, baptized by his godfather, Fr Richard Rimmer, at the Catholic Chapel in Norfolk Row on 6 May, and died in Leeds, on 29 June 1847.

He was educated at Crook Hall, County Durham, and later went to the seminary at Ushaw College.  After being ordained he was based in Manchester, serving the Catholic missions in Rook Street and Granby Row.  During that time he debated with the Protestant Bible Association.

He then went to La Trappe in France, later returned to Ushaw, and after that went to Callaly in Northumberland. He also served parishes in Blackburn, Whitby and Sheffield.  Leeds was suffering from a shortage of Catholic priests, due to an epidemic, when Curr was chaplain to Bishop Briggs; Curr volunteered to serve there, where he died from typhus.

His principal works are:

 The Instructor's Assistant
 Visits to the Blessed Sacrament and to the Blessed Virgin
 Spiritual Retreat (adapted from Bourdaloue
 Familiar Instructions in Catholic Faith and Morality

References
Register of St Marie's RC Church (on Ancestry)
Attribution

1793 births
1847 deaths
19th-century English Roman Catholic priests
Clergy from Sheffield
Alumni of Durham University
Deaths from typhus